Gustavus Vasa may refer to:

 King Gustav I of Sweden
 The play Gustavus Vasa by Henry Brooke, first English play to be banned under the Licensing Act 1737
 Alternate name of Olaudah Equiano, African ex-slave living in 18th century Britain 
 Gustavus Vasa Fox, American naval officer

Vasa, Gustavus